"Iffy" is a song by American singer Chris Brown, released by RCA Records as the lead single from his 10th album Breezy on January 14, 2022.

Background
On the first day of 2022, Brown announced that "Iffy" would be released as the lead single from his upcoming tenth studio album Breezy, posting a teaser clip on Instagram with the caption "Breezy Season Coming! 2022 New Era Unlocked".  The song ended up being included as the album's bonus track on the standard edition.

Content
A press release explained that the song's lyrics contain "Brown boasting about his cars and money". According to British radio station Capital Xtra, lyrically the song has Brown "discussing cars, jewellery, and other lavish items".

Music video
An accompanying music video was released on January 14, 2022, and directed by Joseph Kahn. The video was described by Trent Clark of HipHopDX as taking place in a "Fast & Furious–type drag racing underworld".

Charts

Weekly charts

Year-end charts

References

2022 songs
Songs written by Chris Brown
Chris Brown songs
Songs written by Eric Bellinger

Song recordings produced by OG Parker
Songs written by OG Parker
Songs written by Smash David